The Dix Street-Warner Street Historic District is located in Columbus, Wisconsin, USA.

History
It is a residential neighborhood with houses built from 1941 to 1970. It was added to the National Register of Historic Places in 2017.

References

Historic districts on the National Register of Historic Places in Wisconsin
National Register of Historic Places in Columbia County, Wisconsin